Bolarum railway station (station code: BMO) is an Indian Railways station in Hyderabad, situated in the Indian state of Telangana.

Lines
 Secunderabad–Manmad line
 Bolarum–Secunderabad route (Hyderabad Multi-Modal Transport System)

References

External links
MMTS Timings as per South Central Railway

MMTS stations in Ranga Reddy district
Hyderabad railway division